The General's Fiancée (Finnish: Kenraalin morsian) is a 1951 Finnish comedy film directed by Ville Salminen and starring Sakari Halonen and Leena Häkinen.

Cast
 Sakari Halonen as Pvt. Taavetti Hurskainen  
 Leena Häkinen as Kaisa  
 Eija Inkeri as Helena  
 Eino Kaipainen as Major-general Anton Narva  
 Kullervo Kalske as Captain Saarto  
 Ruth Luoma-Aho as Irma Saarto  
 William Markus as Lieutenant Olavi Naula  
 Lasse Pöysti as Lance corporal Oksapää  
 Irja Ranin as Elli  
 Elsa Turakainen as Sofia Tissari  
 Armas Jokio as Tunnistamaton rooli

References

Bibliography 
 Qvist, Per Olov & von Bagh, Peter. Guide to the Cinema of Sweden and Finland. Greenwood Publishing Group, 2000.

External links 
 

1951 films
1951 comedy films
Finnish comedy films
1950s Finnish-language films
Films directed by Ville Salminen
Finnish black-and-white films